New Zealand won 6 medals at the 1998 Winter Paralympics: 4 golds, 1 silver and 1 bronze medals.

See also
 New Zealand at the Paralympics

References

External links
 International Paralympic Committee
 Paralympics New Zealand

Nations at the 1998 Winter Paralympics
1998
Paralympics